Eduan Swart (born ) is a South African rugby union player for the  in the Currie Cup. His regular position is prop.

Swart was named in the  squad for the Round 6 match of the 2020–21 Currie Cup Premier Division competition.

References

South African rugby union players
Living people
2000 births
Rugby union props
Pumas (Currie Cup) players